Sally Herbert Frankel (1903–1996) was Professor firstly of Colonial Economic Affairs, and later the Economics of Underdeveloped Countries at Oxford University in the period following the Second World War.

Originally from South Africa, of German-Jewish descent, he moved to England shortly after the Second World War. He joined the Mont Pelerin Society in 1950. While not religiously observant, Frankel was committed to the principle of Jewish peoplehood and was a keen Zionist from the First World War onwards.

Publications
 Frankel S. H. (1926) Co- operation and Competition in the Marketing of Maize in South Africa London: P. S. King & Son Ltd.
 Frankel S. H. (1928) Railway Policy of South Africa: An Analysis of the Effects of Railway Rates, Finance and Management on the Economic Development of the Union Johannesburg: Hortors Limited 
 Frankel S. H. (1938) Capital Investment in Africa: its course and effects London: Oxford University Press
 Frankel S. H. (1938) The Economic Impact on Under-developed Societies Oxford: Basil Blackwell
 Frankel S. H. (1977) Money: two philosophies:the Conflict of Trust and Authority Oxford: Basil Blackwell
 Frankel S. H. (1980) Money and Liberty Washington DC: American Enterprise Institute.
 Frankel S. H. (1982) An Economist's Testimony Oxford: Oxford Centre for Postgraduate Hebrew Studies.

References

1903 births
1996 deaths
Place of birth missing
British Zionists
South African Zionists
British people of German-Jewish descent
South African people of German-Jewish descent
Fellows of Nuffield College, Oxford
South African emigrants to the United Kingdom